Haus of Vicious is an American drama television series that premiered on BET on August 17, 2022. 

From creator Jill Ramsey, the eight-episode first season follows Roman’s character Chantel Vivian, a fashion designer whose success is overshadowed by her narcissistic husband, addiction, unresolved childhood traumas, and dysfunctional personal life. With the assistance of her secret weapon, Jaelyn Ryan (Erica Peeples), publicist to her Vicious Empire, Chantel works to rise through the ranks, but her husband Kane’s (Redaric Williams) behavior threatens to tear down the house.

Cast and characters

Main
 Tami Roman as Chantel Vivian
 Redaric Williams as Kane
 Erica Peeples as Jaelyn Ryan
 Norman Nixon Jr. as Milan
 Tiffany Black as Raven
 Kyler O'Neal as Izzy
 Ella Joyce as Carolyn
 Brely Evans as Avery
 Kayla Eva as Dayna
 Lyric Anderson as Tia

Recurring
 Lindsey Pearlman as Karen
 Zariyah Gibson as young Chantel

Episodes

Production

Development
On May 5, 2021, the series was in development by UrbanflixTV. On August 12, 2022, the series was moved to BET where it received a series order. The series premiered on August 17, 2022.

Casting
The main cast was revealed on August 12, 2022.

References

External links
 
 

2020s American black television series
2020s American workplace drama television series
2022 American television series debuts
BET original programming
English-language television shows
Fashion-themed television series
Television shows set in Los Angeles